Manuel C. Téllez Acosta (16 February 1885 – 25 May 1937) was a Mexican politician and diplomat who served as Secretary of the Interior (1931–1932), Secretary of Foreign Affairs (1932–1934), Ambassador of Mexico to the United States (1925–1931), and plenipotentiary diplomatic envoy to Italy and Hungary (1934–1935).

Biography

Téllez was born in Zacatecas, Zacatecas, on 16 February 1885. He was the son of José María Téllez and Jovita Acosta. He graduated from the National Preparatory School in Mexico City.

After joining the foreign service, he was appointed Chargé d'affaires of Mexico to the United States on 3 September 1923 by President Álvaro Obregón. Except for two months (from 15 April to 22 June 1924), Téllez served in the same post until he was promoted to ambassador by President Plutarco Elías Calles. He signed the treaty of the General Claims Convention as ambassador, also the Dean of the Diplomatic Corps since August 1930, and served until 9 November 1931, when he resigned to join the cabinet of President Pascual Ortiz Rubio as secretary of the Interior.

Téllez didn't last long as secretary of the Interior, as President Ortiz Rubio appointed him secretary of Foreign Affairs in January 1932, substituting Genaro Estrada.

Téllez died in Mexico City on 25 May 1937. A few decades later, one of his grandsons, Luis Téllez, served as secretary of Energy in the cabinet of President Ernesto Zedillo and as secretary of Communications and Transportation in the cabinet of President Felipe Calderón.

Works
 (Mexico, 1932).

Notes and references

External links

1885 births
1937 deaths
Mexican Secretaries of the Interior
Mexican Secretaries of Foreign Affairs
Ambassadors of Mexico to the United States
Deans of the Diplomatic Corps to the United States
Ambassadors of Mexico to Italy
Ambassadors of Mexico to Hungary
Politicians from Zacatecas City